Ghana national U-20 football team known as the Black Satellites, is considered to be the feeder team for the Ghana national football team. They are the former FIFA U-20 World Cup Champions and African Youth Champions. They have also been a four-time African Champion in 1995, 1999, 2009, 2021 and a two-time Runner-up at the FIFA World Youth Championship in 1993, 2001 and finished third in 2013. Ghana has participated in only six of the past 19 World Cup events starting with their first in Australia 1993 where they lost the World Cup final 1-2 to Brazil in Sydney and in Argentina 2001 where they lost the World Cup final 0-3 to Argentina in Buenos Aires. Incredibly, in 32 FIFA World Cup matches, Ghana has not lost a game in regulation below the Semi Final level of the FIFA U20 World Cup.
They however failed to qualify for 3 consecutive events in UAE 2003, Netherlands 2005 and Canada 2007 until they made the Egypt 2009 Tournament.

They won the 2009 FIFA U-20 World Cup in the Cairo International Stadium, Cairo, Egypt after defeating Brazil 4-3 on Penalties when the match ended (0-0) after extra time. This was the first time an African country won the FIFA U-20 World Cup Championship.

Superb young players
The Black Satellites reached the FIFA U-20 World Cup final in their 1st appearance in Australia 1993 (Australia 1993 U-20 html Stats here), catching many teams on the hop with their lightning changes of pace. In fact, nine of the 22 players in the "Black Satellites'" squad had lifted the FIFA U-17 World Championship two years earlier, so their performance could only really be considered a half-surprise. Still they were a joy to watch: enterprising and unpredictable. They repeated the feat in 2001 succumbing to Tournament Hosts Argentina in the Final. Previously in 1997, they had lost 3-2 on a golden goal to Uruguay in Extra Time of the World Cup Semi Final. In 1999 eventual Champions Spain eliminated Ghana in the Quarter Final on sudden death penalty kicks after a 1-1 tied game.

What makes Ghana's footballers so dominant in their age group?
FIFA Magazine asked Otto Pfister. Football is not simply the most popular sport in this part of Africa, it is an absolute religion, he said. This is the way the game is regarded in Ghana. Young boys here think about football 24 hours a day and play for at least eight – whether on clay, rough fields or dusty streets. They develop their skills naturally, without any specific training, and end up with superb technique and ability on the ball. They are also fast and tricky, and can feint well with their bodies. Africa and South America have by far the best young footballers in the world – on a technical level they are superb. And technique is what it takes to make a good player.

What else goes towards making Ghana so strong? Otto Pfister continues; In Africa there is often only one way for many young lads to escape from poverty and to make their way up the social scale – football. Youngsters want to become stars and to play in a top European league. That is their main aim and they will do anything to achieve it. Let me give you an example: While I was coaching in Ghana I once told my team to be ready for training at three o'clock in the morning. At half past two they were all assembled and ready to go. They want to learn and they want to play for the national team. They know that in their country a national team player is a hero and enjoys a level of prestige that is not comparable to that in Europe. Another positive point for young players in Ghana is that there are many good coaches in the country who help develop the available talent and above all want to let them play. This policy pays off. Today, many Ghanaian youngsters are in G14 Club Academies in Europe.

Competitive Record

FIFA World Youth Championship Record

Silver background color indicates second-place finish at the World Cup.
Gold background color indicates winners at the World Cup.

*Denote draws including the 2009 Final match decided on penalty kicks v Brazil 4-3p when the match ended (0-0) After Extra Time, and the 1999 Quarter-Final match decided on penalty kicks v Spain (7-8p).

FIFA U20 World Cup Record by team

*Denote draws including the 2009 Final match decided on penalty kicks v Brazil 4-3p when the match ended (0-0) After Extra Time, and the 1999 Quarter-Final match decided on penalty kicks v Spain (7-8p).

FIFA U20 World Cup Record

Team honours and awards

   
FIFA U-20 World Cup Champions: 1
 2009
FIFA U-20 World Cup Runners-up: 2
 1993, 2001
FIFA U-20 World Cup Third-place: 1
 2013
African Youth Championship Champions: 4
 1993, 1999, 2009, 2021
African Youth Championship Runners-up: 2
 2001, 2013
African Youth Championship Third-place: 2
 1991, 2015
WAFU U-20 Championship Champions: 1
 2008
WAFU Zone B U-20 Tournament Champions: 1
 2020

FIFA Golden Ball Winners: 2

FIFA Golden Shoe Winners: 2

Current squad
The following players were selected for the 2022 Maurice Revello Tournament.

Previous squads

2015 FIFA under-20 World Cup (squads) – Ghana
2009 FIFA under-20 World Cup (squads) – Ghana
2001 FIFA under-20 World Cup (squads) – Ghana
1999 FIFA under-20 World Cup (squads) – Ghana
1997 FIFA under-20 World Cup (squads) – Ghana
1993 FIFA under-20 World Cup (squads) – Ghana

Notable players
The following list consist of previous Ghana U-20 national team players who have won or were influential at the FIFA U-20 World Cup with the Ghana U-20 national team or the FIFA U-17 World Cup with the Ghana U-17 national team, and those who were part of the Ghana U-23 national team that won the bronze medal at the 1992 Summer Olympics. The list also includes the players who have graduated from the Ghana U-20 national team and gone on to represent the senior Ghana national team at the FIFA World Cup or African Cup of Nations:

Clifford Aboagye (2013)
Dominic Adiyiah (2009)
Nii Lamptey (1993)
André Ayew (2009)
Daniel Addo (1993)
Samuel Kuffour (1993)
Augustine Ahinful (1993)
Charles Akonnor (1993)
Emmanuel Duah (1993)
Isaac Asare (1993)
Mohammed Gargo (1993)
Christian Gyan (1997)
Awudu Issaka (1997)
Kofi Amponsah (1997)
Stephen Appiah (1997, 1999)
Peter Ofori Quaye (1997, 1999)
Patrick Allotey (1997)
Baffour Gyan (1999)
Laryea Kingston (1999)
George Blay (1999)
Owusu Afriyie (1999)
Michael Essien (2001)
Sulley Muntari (2001)
Anthony Obodai (2001)
John Mensah (2001)
John Paintsil (2001)
Derek Boateng (2001)
Emmanuel Pappoe (2001)
Razak Pimpong (2001)
George Owu (2001)

Notable coaches

2009 FIFA U-20 World Cup World Cup Winner Squad

Head coach:  Samuel Boadu

See also

Ghana national football team
Ghana national U23 football team
Ghana national U17 football team

Footnotes

External links
2007 Toulon Tournament Squad
Ghana Football Association – Official website
Ghana Premier League website
Ghanaweb Sports Page
RSSSF Archive of all FIFA U20 Matches
RSSSF Archive of all African U20 Matches
2009 African U20 Final Highlights

Under-20
African national under-20 association football teams